Jacques Fame Ndongo (born 15 November 1950) is a Cameroonian politician from the Cameroon People's Democratic Movement. He has served as Minister of Higher Education since 2004, currently in Joseph Ngute's government.

References 

Living people
1950 births

Communication ministers of Cameroon
Higher education ministers of Cameroon
Cameroon People's Democratic Movement politicians
21st-century Cameroonian politicians